Only in Dreams is the second studio album by English drum and bass production duo Delta Heavy. Drum and bass record label RAM Records released the album on 22 March 2019.

Background
Only in Dreams was announced in January 2019. To promote the album, the duo released "Take Me Home" featuring English singer Jem Cooke in February. In an interview with Dancing Astronaut, the duo cited the song as one of their favourites from the album, reasoning that it allowed them to represent the variety in their sound.

To further promote the album, Delta Heavy announced a world tour, which began on 1 February and concluded on 15 June.

In an interview with EDMIdentity, Simon Hall described that despite the lack of a concrete concept for the album, he and Ben James came up with the title independently and that it was relatable.

Reception
Only in Dreams was met with positive reviews. BroadwayWorld praised the album on release, calling it a "work of maturity and bristling confidence."

Track list

Charts

References

2019 albums
Drum and bass albums